George Hugh Niederauer (June 14, 1936 – May 2, 2017) was an American bishop of the Roman Catholic Church. He was the Archbishop of San Francisco. Before that, Niederauer served as Bishop of Salt Lake City from 1994 to 2005.

Biography
George Niederauer was born in Los Angeles, California, the only child of George and Elaine Niederauer. He attended St. Catherine's Military School and then St. Anthony High School; he was a classmate of Cardinal William Levada. After graduating in 1954, he attended Stanford University. During his freshman year Niederauer changed course and decided to enter St. John's Seminary in Camarillo, from where in 1959 he earned a Bachelor of Philosophy degree. He further completed his studies with a Bachelor of Sacred Theology degree from the Catholic University of America in Washington, D.C., and a Master of Arts degree in English literature from Loyola University, Los Angeles, in 1962. Niederauer also earned a Ph.D. in English Literature at USC.

Niederauer was ordained to the priesthood on April 30, 1962. He was raised to the rank of Honorary Prelate of His Holiness in 1984. Niederauer served as Rector of St. John’s Seminary in Camarillo from 1987 to 1992. He was appointed the eighth Bishop of Salt Lake City by Pope John Paul II on November 3, 1994. Niederauer received his episcopal consecration on January 25, 1995, from Cardinal Roger Mahony, with Archbishop William Levada and Bishop Tod David Brown serving as co-consecrators. As bishop he was seen as "the most approachable of persons and one whose homilies were almost magical in their ability to make potentially difficult Scripture passages and theological concepts comprehensible and applicable – even inspiring – in our daily lives."

On December 15, 2005, Pope Benedict XVI named him to succeed William Levada as the eighth Metropolitan Archbishop of San Francisco, following Levada's appointment to Pope Benedict's former post of Prefect of the Congregation of the Doctrine of the Faith in the Roman Curia. Archbishop Niederauer was the chairman of the United States Conference of Catholic Bishops Committee on Communication, and a member of the Pontifical Council for Social Communications.

On August 29, 2011, Niederauer underwent emergency double by-pass heart surgery.

On July 27, 2012, the apostolic nuncio to the United States announced that the Holy See had accepted Niederauer's letter of resignation, and Salvatore J. Cordileone was appointed the Archbishop-elect of San Francisco. On that day, the see of San Francisco became vacant, and Niederauer attained the title Archbishop Emeritus.

Views

Support of Proposition 8
In 2008, Archbishop Niederauer campaigned in favor of California's Proposition 8, a ballot measure to recognize heterosexual marriage as the only valid marriage within California. Niederauer claims to have been instrumental in forging alliances between Catholics and Mormons to support the measure. Wrote the San Francisco Chronicle, "Niederauer drew in the Church of Jesus Christ of Latter-day Saints and proved to be a critical move in building a multi-religious coalition—the backbone of the fundraising, organizing and voting support for the successful ballot measure. By bringing together Mormons and Catholics, Niederauer would align the two most powerful religious institutions in the Prop. 8 battle."

Films
The archbishop said that he had seen Brokeback Mountain, making him the first senior American cleric to state that he has viewed the film. When asked for his reaction he said that "I thought it was very powerful, and I probably had a different take on it than a lot of people did.... It was a story not only about the relationship between the two principal characters, but very much a cluster of relationships... And I think in all of that one of the lessons is the destructiveness of not being honest with yourself, and not being honest with other people – and not being faithful, trying to live a double life, and what that does to each of the lives you try to live."

Abstinence
"Our belief is that we have to hold up the standard of abstinence, and we do that in all of our teaching about sexuality by saying that sexual activity outside of marriage is wrong. Now that's a very high bar to set and I understand that. And I don't regret that – I subscribe to it and I teach it. I understand why people find it difficult and disagree with it. I understand why they do. I don't agree with them.... What I would say is that people who disagree with us can disagree without being disagreeable."

Moral teaching
"Authentic moral teaching is based on objective truth, not polling."

See also

 Catholic Church hierarchy
 Catholic Church in the United States
 Historical list of the Catholic bishops of the United States
 List of Catholic bishops of the United States
 Lists of patriarchs, archbishops, and bishops

Sources 
 
 Salt Lake Diocese press release of Niederauer's appointment as archbishop

References

External links
 Roman Catholic Archdiocese of San Francisco Official Site

Episcopal succession

1936 births
2017 deaths
People from Los Angeles
Roman Catholic bishops of Salt Lake City
20th-century Roman Catholic bishops in the United States
21st-century Roman Catholic archbishops in the United States
Roman Catholic archbishops of San Francisco
Catholic University of America alumni
Catholics from California